This is a list of broadcast television stations that are licensed in the U.S. state of Maine.

Full-power stations 
VC refers to the station's PSIP virtual channel. RF refers to the station's physical RF channel.

Defunct full-power stations 
Channel 17: WLAM-TV - DuMont - Lewiston (11/22/1953-3/25/1955)
Channel 53: WPMT - DuMont - Portland (8/30/1953-12/15/1954)

LPTV stations

Translators

See also 
 Free-to-air#North_America - Satellite

Maine

Maine-related lists